The Los Angeles Department of Transportation, commonly referred to as LADOT, is a municipal agency that oversees transportation planning, design, construction, maintenance and operations within the city of Los Angeles. LADOT was created by city ordinance, and is run by a general manager appointed by the Mayor of Los Angeles, under the oversight of a citizens' commission also appointed by the mayor. LADOT is best known for providing public transportation to the City of Los Angeles. It currently operates the second-largest fleet in Los Angeles County next to Metro. It consist of over 300 vehicles, serving nearly 30 million passengers a year and operating over 800,000 hours.

LADOT also develops the traffic signal timing and transportation planning for the city. Actual road maintenance and construction is provided by the Los Angeles City Department of Public Works. LADOT performs many transportation related duties, with six main operating groups: Parking Enforcement & Traffic Control, Operations, Project Delivery, Parking Management & Regulations, Transit Services, and Administration.

Current LADOT transit services

DASH

DASH is LADOT's system of neighborhood circulator bus services. DASH buses serve to provide localized service in a neighborhood, and for passengers making longer trips, acting as a feeder to the countywide Metro Bus and Metro Rail system.

The name DASH started as acronym for Downtown Area Short Hop, the original purpose of the service. Since its launch in Downtown Los Angeles, DASH has expanded to 27 other neighborhoods in the City of Los Angeles.

All buses in the DASH fleet are powered by either low-emission CNG or Propane engines or are zero-emission battery electric buses.

DASH routes include:
Beachwood Canyon (connects with Metro B Line)
Boyle Heights/East LA (connects with Metro J Line, L Line)
Chesterfield Square (connects with Metro A Line)
Crenshaw (connects with Metro E Line and K Line)
Downtown A: Arts District–City West (connects with Metro A Line, B Line, D Line, E Line, J Line and L Line)
Downtown B: Chinatown–Financial District (connects with Metro A Line, B Line, D Line, E Line, J Line, L Line, Metrolink and Amtrak)
Downtown D: Union Station–South Park–LATTC (connects with Metro A Line, B Line, D Line, E Line, J Line, L Line, Metrolink and Amtrak)
Downtown E: Westlake/MacArthur Park–Financial District (connects with Metro A Line, B Line, D Line, E Line and J Line)
Downtown F: Financial District–Exposition Park–USC (connects with Metro A Line, B Line, D Line, E Line and J Line)
El Sereno/City Terrace
Fairfax
Highland Park/Eagle Rock (connects with Metro L Line)
Hollywood (connects with the Metro B Line)
Hollywood/Wilshire (Larchmont Shuttle) (connects with Metro B Line and D Line)
King-East (connects with Metro A Line, E Line and J Line)
Leimert/Slauson (connects with Metro K Line)
Lincoln Heights/Chinatown (connects with Metro J Line, L Line)
Midtown (connects with Metro E Line)
North Hollywood (connects with Metro B Line and G Line)
Northridge/Reseda (connects with Metrolink Ventura County Line)
Observatory/Los Feliz (connects with Metro B Line)
Panorama City/Van Nuys (connects with Metro G Line and Metrolink Ventura County Line)
Pico Union/Echo Park (connects with Metro A Line, B Line and D Line)
Pueblo Del Rio (connects with Metro A Line)
San Pedro (connects with Metro J Line)
Southeast (connects with Metro A Line and J Line)
Sylmar (connects with Metrolink Antelope Valley Line)
Van Nuys/Studio City (connects with Metro G Line)
Vermont/Main (connects with Metro J Line)
Watts (connects with Metro A Line and C Line)
Wilmington (connects with Metro J Line)
Wilshire Center/Koreatown (connects with Metro B Line and D Line)

Commuter Express
Commuter Express is an express bus service, consisting of 15 routes, all but one running during rush hours only. Service started in 1985. Fares are based on a flat rate for travel on streets plus an extra charge based on the distance traveled on freeways.

All buses in the Commuter Express fleet are powered by low-emission CNG engines.

Route 142 operates more like a normal transit bus route, operating daily at all hours, using more typical transit buses. The route was previously operated by Long Beach Transit. 

Routes 419, 423, 431, 437, 438, and 448 are former Southern California Rapid Transit District lines that were transferred to LADOT. 

Unless otherwise noted, all services operates towards Downtown LA during the morning rush and from Downtown LA during the afternoon rush. For the purposes of this chart, closed-door means that customers are not allowed to use buses for local trips and open-door means that customers are allowed to use buses for local trips.

CityRide

CityRide is a program for individuals in the city of Los Angeles, aged 65 or older and for qualified disabled persons.

In popular culture 
The transit agency makes a cameo appearance in the Animaniacs episode "Hooray for North Hollywood Part 2", where Dot Warner spots an LADOT bus, thinking it was named in her honor. She then sings gleefully about it, but Yakko corrects his sister, telling her what LADOT actually means. Realizing her mistake, Dot nevertheless finishes her song on a positive note.

Fleet

References

External links
Los Angeles Department of Transportation
TrafficInfo
Department summary, p. 36

Public transportation in Los Angeles County, California
Bus transportation in California
Transportation in Los Angeles
Transportation in the San Fernando Valley
Transportation in Los Angeles County, California
Transportation
Transit authorities with alternative-fuel vehicles